Dinitroglycoluril (DINGU) is a high explosive chemical compound with the formula C4H4N6O6. Dinitroglycoluril is of growing interest due to its stability, ability to mix with oxygen positive explosives to form composites, and it is a precursor to tetranitroglycoluril.

Preparation and decomposition 
Dinitroglycoluril can be created by nitrating glycoluril with concentrated nitric acid.

The activation energy required to begin decomposition of dinitroglycoluril is 165 kJ/mol. When dinitroglycoluril is heated to 243 °C in an inert atmosphere, the two nitrate groups break off and the two central carbon atoms form a double bond.

Sensitivity 
The impact sensitivity of dinitroglycoluril was determined using the Bruceton-staircase procedure, which found a h50 of 88 cm. Friction sensitivity was determined by a Julius-Peters apparatus, which found a sensitivity of 25 kg.

References 

Explosive chemicals
Nitrogen heterocycles